The 1993 Junior League World Series took place from August 16–21 in Taylor, Michigan, United States. Cayey, Puerto Rico defeated Reynosa, Mexico in the championship game.

Teams

Results

References

Junior League World Series
Junior League World Series
Junior